Yosef Shlomo Kahaneman (1886–1969), known also as Ponevezher Rav, was an Orthodox rabbi and rosh yeshiva of the Ponevezh Yeshiva. He was a renowned Torah and Talmudic scholar, a distinguished member of the Council of Torah Sages of Agudath Israel.

Biography 

Rabbi Kahaneman was born 13 May 1886 in Kul, Kovno Governorate of the Russian Empire (present-day Lithuania), a small town of about 300, of which about a third were Jews.

As a young boy he attended the Yeshivah in Plungė led by Rabbi Chaim Yitzchak Hacohen Bloch, who is credited with cultivating Kahaneman's potential. At the age of 14, he went to study Talmud at the Telshe yeshiva, where he studied Torah until he was twenty, under the tutelage of Rabbi Eliezer Gordon and Rabbi Shimon Shkop. He then spent half a year in Novardok yeshiva, after which he spent three years in Raduń Yeshiva studying under the Chofetz Chaim and Rabbi Naftoli Trop.

He married the daughter of the rabbi of Vidzh, and became rabbi there at the end of 1911, when his father-in-law became the rabbi of Vilkomir (Ukmergė).

With the passing of Rabbi Yitzhak Yaakov Rabinovich in 1919, Kahaneman was appointed the new rabbi of Ponevezh, one of the largest centers of Jewish life in Lithuania. He built there three yeshivas, as well as a school and an orphanage. All of these institutions were destroyed - and many of his students and family killed - during World War II.

He was elected to the Lithuanian parliament. He was also a member of the autonomous National Council of Lithuanian Jewry and an active member and leader of Agudat Yisrael.

The outbreak of World War II caught him during his visit to the British Mandate of Palestine, after which he was intending to visit the United States. Learning about the Red Army's occupation of Lithuania, he decided to stay in Palestine. He continued, from a distance, to oversee the Panevezh Yeshiva. After the entrance of the Nazis in Ponevezh, the yeshiva was destroyed and all students were murdered. A few years later, in 1944, Kahaneman succeeded in re-establishing the Ponevezh Yeshiva in Bnei Brak. After unsuccessful attempts to save European Jews, Kahaneman focused on developing communities in Palestine, building Kiryat Ha-Yeshiva ("Town of the Yeshiva") in Bnei Brak and Batei Avot orphanages. He also traveled widely in the diaspora to secure financial support for the yeshiva, which he constantly improved and extended. With the help of long time friend Rav Moshe Okun, Kahaneman succeeded in turning the re-established Ponevezh yeshiva into one of the largest in the world- a leading one among the Litvishe.

He sought to take care of many orphans, especially the Yaldei Tehran ("Children of Tehran") – children who escaped from Nazi Europe by walking across Europe to Tehran - as well as other refugees, among them Biala Rebbe – Rabbi Ben Zion Rabinowitz. He referred to his numerous activities as doing them with "21 fingers" - the fingers of his hands (10), feet (10), and the finger of God (1).

Kahaneman died on 3 September 1969 in Bnei Brak, Israel. After his death the Ponevezh Yeshiva community divided into two over the conflict on leadership.

Kahaneman wrote Talmudic commentaries and an exegesis on the Passover Haggadah, though these - together with transcripts of his lessons - were published only after his death.

Opinion on State of Israel and Zionism 
In contrast to the prevalent Haredi opposition to Zionism, Kahaneman showed signs of support for the State of Israel. He found important the religious establishment of the State of Israel after the experience of Holocaust. He believed it was the plan of God. He is known for insisting that the flag of Israel be flown outside of the Ponevezh Yeshiva on Israel's Independence Day (a practice still continued to this day). He also refrained from saying the Tachanun prayer - a daily prayer of penitence - on that day, as a sign of celebration.

Kahaneman was also approached - among a few others - by David Ben-Gurion, the Israeli Prime Minister - to help answer the question on the definition of "Jew" for the State of Israel. In his reply, Kahaneman wrote: "I see the vision of the return to Zion in our generation as the revelation of the light of divine providence, which strengthens our hand and accompanies us through the evil waters which have risen against us … I see miracles every moment, every hour! I am sure that His Honor [i.e., Ben-Gurion] sees these things as I do, in the same way as these miracles are seen by the ship's captain standing at the wheel of his ship."

Following Israel's military victories during the Six Day War, he published an article in which he praised these as "obvious miracles", adding that "even blind people can sense palpable miracles... the miracles, wonders, salvations... the comforts and battles" and called upon recognizing them as such and observing the "wondrous period".

See also 
 Lithuanian Jews
 Ponevezh yeshiva

References 

1886 births
1969 deaths
People from Plungė District Municipality
People from Telshevsky Uyezd
Jews from the Russian Empire
Lithuanian Haredi rabbis
Lithuanian emigrants to Mandatory Palestine
Ashkenazi rabbis in Mandatory Palestine
Israeli people of Lithuanian-Jewish descent
Haredi rabbis in Israel
Members of the Seimas
Ponevezh Rosh yeshivas
Ponevezh Yeshiva
Raduń Yeshiva alumni
Rabbis in Bnei Brak
Novardok Yeshiva alumni